The Night Belongs to Us, released in English as The Night Is Ours or The Night Belongs to Us, is a 1929 German sports romance film directed by Carl Froelich and Henry Roussel, and starring Hans Albers, Charlotte Ander, and Otto Wallburg.

Production
The film was based on a 1925 play by Henry Kistemaeckers. Art direction was by Franz Schroedter. It was shot at the Tempelhof Studios. The film's exterior scenes were shot on location in Sicily and the AVUS racetrack in Berlin, and was one of the first German part-sound films to be released during the transition from silent to sound. A separate French language version The Night Is Ours was also released, directed by Roger Lion.

Cast

References

Bibliography

External links

1929 films
Films of the Weimar Republic
1920s romance films
1920s sports films
German romance films
German sports films
1920s German-language films
Films directed by Carl Froelich
German films based on plays
Transitional sound films
Films set in Berlin
Films set in Italy
Films shot in Berlin
Films shot in Italy
German auto racing films
German multilingual films
Films shot at Tempelhof Studios
German black-and-white films
1920s multilingual films
1920s German films
Silent sports films